A kiondo is a handwoven bag made from indigenous vegetable twine with leather trimmings. It is indigenous to the Taita, Kikuyu and Kamba tribes of Kenya.  

The Swahili word for a kiondoo is 'chondo,' plural 'vyondo'.

References

External links
 Source of Dfinition

African clothing
Bags (fashion)
Kenyan culture